Via Wireless is a 1915 American silent drama film directed by George Fitzmaurice and starring Bruce McRae, Gail Kane and Brandon Hurst.

Cast
 Bruce McRae as Lt. Sommers 
 Gail Kane as Frances Durant 
 Henry Weaver as John Durant 
 Brandon Hurst as Edward Pinckney 
 Paul McAllister as Marsh

References

Bibliography
 Jay Robert Nash, Robert Connelly & Stanley Ralph Ross. Motion Picture Guide Silent Film 1910-1936. Cinebooks, 1988.

External links
 

1915 films
1915 drama films
1910s English-language films
American silent feature films
Silent American drama films
American black-and-white films
Films directed by George Fitzmaurice
1910s American films